Tegula kusairo is a species of edible marine snail discovered in the year 2020 in Japan by Yamazaki, Hirano, Chiba & Fukuda. The species was verified by Tohoku University and Okayama University.

References

kusairo
Molluscs of Japan
Gastropods described in 2020